Julio Herrera may refer to:
 Julio Herrera (cyclist) (born 1980), track and road cyclist from Venezuela
Julio Herrera (equestrian) (1911–?), Mexican Olympic horse rider
 Julio Herrera (politician), Peruvian politician
 Julio César Herrera (born 1977), Cuban track cyclist 
Julio Herrera Velutini (born 1971), international banker 
Julio Herrera y Obes (1841–1912), Uruguayan political figure
Julio Herrera y Reissig (1875–1910), Uruguayan poet, playwright and essayist